Georg Philipp Telemann's Concertos for Four Violins  (TWV 40:201–204; original title: Concertos à 4 Violini Concertati) is a set of four concertos for four violins without continuo. Each concerto has four movements.

Concerto in G major TWV 40:201 
Largo e staccato
Allegro
Adagio
Vivace

Concerto in D major TWV 40:202 
Adagio
Allegro
Grave
Allegro

Concerto in C major TWV 40:203 
Grave
Allegro
Largo e staccato
Allegro

Concerto in A major TWV 40:204 
Grave
Allegro
Adagio
Spirituoso

External links

 

Compositions by Georg Philipp Telemann
Telemann